Aronov and Aronoff are Slavic (Russian or Soviet) Jewish family names. Notable persons with these names include:

Aronov 
 Arkady Aronov (1934–1994), Russian-Israeli theoretical condensed matter physicist
 Boris Aronov (born 1963), American computer scientist
 Michael Aronov (born 1962), American actor and playwright
 Raisa Aronova, (1920–1982), Soviet aviator and KGB agent

Aronoff 
 Kenny Aronoff (born 1953), American musician
 Mark Aronoff, Canadian-American morphologist, linguist, and professor
 Stan Aronoff (born 1932), American politician

See also 
 Shara L. Aranoff, Chairman of the U.S. International Trade Commission from 2005 to 2014
 Aronoff Center, performing arts center in downtown Cincinnati
 Aronow, surname
 Bishop v. Aronov, lawsuit

References 

Russian-Jewish surnames
Russian-language surnames
Slavic-language surnames
Kazakh-language surnames